Alexandru Nilca (born 6 November 1945) is a retired Romanian (ethnic Hungarian) sabre fencer. He competed at the 1976 and 1980 Olympics and won a team bronze medal in 1976, placing fifth in 1980. He won two team silver medals at the world championships in 1974 and 1977.

References

External links
 
 
 

1945 births
Living people
Romanian male fencers
Romanian sabre fencers
Olympic fencers of Romania
Fencers at the 1976 Summer Olympics
Fencers at the 1980 Summer Olympics
Olympic bronze medalists for Romania
Olympic medalists in fencing
Sportspeople from Târgu Mureș
Medalists at the 1976 Summer Olympics